Norman Moody (December 22, 1915 – October 23, 2004) was a British-Canadian electrical engineer.  Born in England, he first worked at Halcyon Radio, where he worked on the design and production of early electronic television sets.  During the Second World War he worked at the Telecommunications Research Establishment developing airborne radar systems.  He emigrated to Canada after the war and joined the National Research Council Chalk River Laboratories, where he developed nuclear instrumentation. In 1951-1952 he worked on instrumentation for the British atomic bomb tests. At the (Canadian) Defence Research Telecommunications Establishment, he was involved in the development of the DRTE Computer, which also was an introduction to semiconductors for the Canadian military.

In 1959 Norman Moody became the head of Electrical Engineering at the University of Saskatchewan, where he developed Canada's first graduate program in biomedical engineering. He transferred in 1962 to become director of the Institute of Biomedical Electronics in Toronto until his retirement in 1975.

Norman Moody was made a Fellow of the Institution of Electrical Engineers in 1962, and elected as a Fellow of the Royal Society of Canada in 1972.

References

1915 births
2004 deaths
Canadian electrical engineers
British emigrants to Canada
Fellows of the Royal Society of Canada